Bristlecone are three species of pine tree.

Bristlecone may also refer to:

 Bristlecone Holdings, a consumer finance business specializing in the leasing of tangible goods, in Nevada, US
 Bristlecone, a quantum computing processor by Google Quantum AI Lab